Rip Collins may refer to:

Rip Collins (pitcher) (1896–1968), American Major League Baseball player
Rip Collins (catcher) (1909–1969), American Major League Baseball backup catcher
Albin "Rip" Collins (born 1927), American National Football League player

See also
Ripper Collins (baseball) (1904–1970), American Major League Baseball first baseman
Ripper Collins (wrestler) (1933–1991), American professional wrestler
Collins (surname)